Hopi are a Native American people.

Hopi may also refer to:

Hopi language, Uto-Aztecan language spoken by the Hopi people
Hopi (missile), a nuclear air-to-surface missile developed by the U.S. Navy in the 1950s
2938 Hopi, main-belt asteroid 
Hebi, also spelled as Hopi, city in Henan, China
Hands Off the People of Iran, or HOPI, a British organisation

See also
Hopi Reservation, Native American reservation for the Hopi and Arizona Tewa people
Hopi-Dart, a sounding rocket